Alexander Dunlop may refer to:

Alexander Dunlop (scholar) (1684–1747), professor of Greek at the University of Glasgow
Alexander Dunlop (politician) (1809–1852), member of the Victorian Legislative Council from 1851
Alexander Francis Dunlop (1842–1923), Canadian architect
Alexander Rankin Dunlop (1868–1944), British Resident in Tawau of North Borneo

See also
 Alexander Colquhoun-Stirling-Murray-Dunlop (1798–1870), Scottish church lawyer and politician